Adreno is a series of graphics processing unit (GPU) semiconductor intellectual property cores developed by Qualcomm and used in many of their SoCs.

History 
Adreno (an anagram of AMD's graphic card brand Radeon), was originally developed by ATI Technologies and sold to Qualcomm in 2009 for $65M, and was used in their mobile chipset products. Early Adreno models included the Adreno 100 and 110, which had 2D graphics acceleration and limited multimedia capabilities. At the time, 3D graphics on mobile platforms were commonly handled using software-based rendering engines, which limited their performance. With growing demand for more advanced multimedia and 3D graphics capabilities, Qualcomm licensed the Imageon IP from AMD, in order to add hardware-accelerated 3D capabilities to their mobile products. Further collaboration with AMD resulted in the development of the Adreno 200, originally named the AMD Z430, based on the R400 architecture used in the Xenos GPU of the Xbox 360 video game console and released in 2008, which was integrated into the first Snapdragon SoC. In January 2009, AMD sold their entire Imageon handheld device graphics division to Qualcomm.

Technical details

Variants 
The company offers Adreno GPUs in various types, as a component of their Snapdragon SoCs:

Notes

 Adreno 130 inside the MSM7x01, and MSM7x01A. It supports OpenGL ES 1.1, OpenVG 1.1, EGL 1.3, Direct3D Mobile, SVGT 1.2, Direct Draw and GDI. 
 Adreno 200 (AMD Z430) inside the QSD8x50  and MSM7x27 (133 MHz). It offers a programmable function pipeline and streaming textures with support for OpenGL ES 1.0, OpenGL ES 1.1, OpenVG 1.1, EGL 1.4, Direct3D Mobile, SVGT 1.2 and DirectDraw. (22M triangles/second, 133M pixels/second, clock speed up to 133 MHz)
 Adreno 200 enhanced inside the MSM7x25A and MSM7x27A (200 MHz). It supports OpenGL ES 2.0, OpenGL ES 1.1, OpenVG 1.1, EGL 1.4, Direct3D Mobile, SVGT 1.2, Direct Draw and GDI. (40M triangles/second, 200M pixels/second, clock speed up to 200 MHz)
 Adreno 203 inside the MSM8225 and MSM8225Q (400 MHz). It is an improvement over Adreno 205. It features a higher frequency, has better pixel fillrate, lower power consumption, better 3D performance. It is about 50-100% faster than Adreno 200 (enhanced), and 10–25% than Adreno 205. It could clock 2x times higher than Adreno 205. It supports OpenGL ES 2.0, OpenGL ES 1.1, OpenVG 1.1, EGL 1.4, Direct3D Mobile, DirectX 9.0c, SVGT 1.2, Direct Draw and GDI. (42-50M triangles/second, 250-300M pixels/second, clock speed from 192 to 400 MHz)
 Adreno 205 inside the QSD8x50A, MSM7x30, and MSM8x55 (245 MHz). Its improvements include Hardware-accelerated SVG and Adobe Flash and better shader-performance than the Adreno 200. It supports OpenGL ES 2.0, OpenGL ES 1.1, OpenVG 1.1, EGL 1.4, Direct3D Mobile, SVGT 1.2, Direct Draw and GDI. (57M triangles/second, 250M pixels/second, clock speed up to 400 MHz)
 Adreno 220 inside the MSM8660 or MSM8260 (266 MHz) with single channel memory. It supports OpenGL ES 2.0, OpenGL ES 1.1, OpenVG 1.1, EGL 1.4, Direct3D Mobile, DirectX 9.0c, SVGT 1.2, Direct Draw and GDI. (88M triangles/second, 500M pixels/second, standard clock speed up to 266 MHz, overclock up to 400 MHz)
 Adreno 225 inside the MSM8960 (400 MHz), with unified shader architecture and dual channel memory. It supports Direct3D 9.0c in addition to OpenGL ES 2.0, OpenGL ES 1.1, OpenVG 1.1, EGL 1.4, Direct3D Mobile, SVGT 1.2, Direct Draw and GDI.
 Adreno 320 inside the Qualcomm S4 Pro & Prime Series, with unified shader architecture and dual channel memory. It supports Direct3D feature level 9_3 in addition to OpenGL ES 3.0, OpenGL ES 2.0, OpenGL ES 1.1, OpenVG 1.1, EGL 1.4, Direct3D Mobile, SVGT 1.2
 Adreno 330 inside the Nexus 5, Amazon Kindle HDX series tablets, Amazon Fire phone, Nokia Lumia 2520 tablet, Nokia Lumia 1520, Nokia Lumia Icon, Nokia Lumia 930, Samsung Galaxy S5, Samsung Galaxy Note 3, Sony Xperia Z1, Sony Xperia Z1 Compact, Sony Xperia Z2, Sony Xperia Z3, Sony Xperia Z3 Compact, Sony Xperia Z Ultra, Xiaomi Mi3, Xiaomi Mi4, OnePlus One, HTC One (M8) and LG G2/G3 smartphones.
 Adreno 420 inside the Qualcomm Snapdragon 805 supports Direct3D 11.2 runtime (feature level 11_1). Inside the Google Nexus 6, Samsung Galaxy S5 LTE-A, Samsung Galaxy Note 4, Samsung Galaxy Note Edge, LG G3 Cat. 6, Amazon Fire HDX 8.9 (2014). The Qualcomm Snapdragon 805 is the first phone SoC ever to feature a 128-bit memory bus.
Adreno 540 inside the Qualcomm Snapdragon 835 is the first phone SoC to feature variable refresh rate and foveated rendering/Variate Rate Shading, Qualcomm calls their implementations Q-Sync and Adreno Foveation.
Adreno 630 inside the Qualcomm Snapdragon 845 is the first phone SoC to feature Inside-Out Room-scale 6DoF with SLAM.
Adreno 640 inside the Qualcomm Snapdragon 855 is the first phone SoC to feature updateable GPU drivers from the Google Play Store.
Adreno 660 inside the Qualcomm Snapdragon 888 is the first phone SoC to feature Variable Rate Shading (VRS).

Operating system support 

There are proprietary drivers for the Linux-based mobile operating system Android available from Qualcomm themselves.
Historically the only way to have GPU support on non-Android Linux was with the libhybris wrapper.

Linux and Mesa supports the Adreno 200/300/400/500 series of GPUs with a driver called freedreno. Freedreno allows fully open-source graphics on devices like the 96Boards Dragonboard 410c and Nexus 7 (2013).

See also
Qualcomm Hexagon
List of Qualcomm Snapdragon processors
PowerVR – competing graphics technology available as a Silicon IP core (SIP)  to 3rd parties
 Mali – competing graphics technology available as a Silicon IP core (SIP)  to 3rd parties
 Vivante – competing graphics technology available as a Silicon IP core (SIP)  to 3rd parties
 Tegra – family of SoCs for mobile computers, the graphics core could be available as SIP block to 3rd parties
 VideoCore – family of SOCs, by Broadcom, for mobile computers, the graphics core could be available as SIP block to 3rd parties
 Atom family of SoCs – with Intel graphics core, not licensed to 3rd parties
 AMD mobile APUs – with AMD graphics core, not licensed to 3rd parties
 AMD Imageon (ATI Imageon) - List of ATI mobile GPU
 Intel 2700G - Old Intel mobile GPU
 List of Nvidia graphics processing units - GPU Nvidia
 Apple M1

References

External links

Additional information on history of Adreno

Graphics processing units
Qualcomm IP cores